Stamnoctenis is a genus of moths in the family Geometridae first described by Warren in 1901.

Species
Stamnoctenis morrisata (Hulst, 1887)
Stamnoctenis pearsalli (Swett, 1914)
Stamnoctenis rubrosuffusa (Grossbeck, 1912)
Stamnoctenis ululata (Pearsall, 1912)
Stamnoctenis costimacula (Grossbeck, 1912)
Stamnoctenis similis (W. S. Wright, 1927)
Stamnoctenis vernon Guedet, 1939

References

Stamnodini